

Players

Competitions

League Two

League table

Results summary

League position by match

Matches

FA Cup

Carling Cup

LDV Vans Trophy

Appearances, goals and cards

Clean sheets
Includes all competitive matches.

Northampton Town F.C. seasons
Northampton Town